The 1998 Ireland rugby union tour of South Africa was the team's third tour to the country, having previously visited in 1961 and 1981. Both Paul Wallace and Keith Wood had previously been on a tour to South Africa with the British and Irish Lions in 1997. Cape Town-born Dion O'Cuinneagain, had captained South Africa at both schoolboy and sevens level, before he switched allegiances. He made his senior international debut for Ireland in the 37–13 defeat against South Africa on 13 June 1998. Justin Fitzpatrick and Trevor Brennan also made their senior international debuts in the same game. A fourth debutant, Justin Bishop, scored a try while Eric Elwood added a conversion and two penalties. South Africa won the series 2-0, but the series was marred by violence and ill-will between the two teams.

Non-international matches
Scores and results list Ireland's points tally first.

Test matches

First Test
Many predicted South Africa, who were wearing white jerseys due to the colour clash with Ireland's green jumper, to win their first test match of the season comfortably. While they eventually did so, the visitors competed admirably in the first half, trailing by only three points at half time, 13−10. The Springboks, who looked rusty in the first half, finally clicked in the second half and debutant winger Stefan Terblanche scored four tries.

Second Test
The Springboks had to make one change to their line-up for the second test in Pretoria, with Gaffie du Toit unavailable due to a rib injury and replaced by Franco Smith. The Springboks completed a shut-out to seal the series and scored five tries in the process, but the match was a very spiteful one marred by numerous cynical incidents and brawls which eventually resulted in Springbok lock Krynauw Otto getting time in the sin bin.

Touring party
 Manager: Donal Lenihan
 Assistant Manager: Phil Danaher
 Coach: Warren Gatland
 Captain: Paddy Johns

Backs

Forwards

References

Ireland national rugby union team tours
Rugby union tours of South Africa
Ireland tour
Ire
South